, was an admiral in the Imperial Japanese Navy during World War II.

Biography
Marumo was a native of Nagano prefecture. He graduated from the 40th class of the Imperial Japanese Naval Academy in 1912, ranked 47th out of 144 cadets.

After completion of his torpedo and naval artillery training, he was assigned to the battleship .

In 1917, Marumo was assigned to the second Special Task Fleet under Admiral Kozo Sato, a task force of Japanese destroyers deployed to Malta in the Mediterranean as part of Japan’s assistance to the Allied war effort under the Anglo-Japanese Alliance. After his return to Japan in 1918, he was promoted to lieutenant and assigned to the cruiser . In 1921, he became chief gunnery officer on the destroyer , and later that year was made executive officer on destroyer . After his promotion to lieutenant commander in 1924, he was assigned to the cruiser , battleship  and destroyer . In 1929, he made commander, and joined the Imperial Japanese Navy General Staff in a number of shore assignments. He served as a military attaché to the United States and Europe from December 1933-July 1934.

In December 1937, Marumo was given his first (and only) command: the heavy cruiser . From 1938-1939, he was assigned to the Kure Naval District. Marumo was promoted to rear admiral in November 1939.

After the start of the Pacific War, Marumo was on the staff of the IJN 4th Fleet. He commanded the Support Group during the Battle of the Coral Sea.

From December 1942, Marumo was assigned as naval attaché to the Empire of Manchukuo, where he spent most of the remainder of the war. He was promoted to vice admiral in November 1943. Repatriated to Japan in July 1947, Marumo in retirement until his death in 1985.

References

Notes

1891 births
1985 deaths
Military personnel from Nagano Prefecture
Japanese admirals of World War II
Imperial Japanese Navy admirals